Laibach is a river of North Rhine-Westphalia, Germany, near Halle (Westfalen). It is the left headstream of the Ruthebach.

It should not be confused with the upper course of the Rhedaer Bach that is often also called Laibach.

See also
List of rivers of North Rhine-Westphalia

References

Rivers of North Rhine-Westphalia
Rivers of Germany